Banat-Brestowatz may refer to:
Brestovăț, Romania
Banatski Brestovac, Serbia